Křivoklát is a market town in Rakovník District in the Central Bohemian Region of the Czech Republic. It has about 700 inhabitants. It is known for the Křivoklát Castle.

Administrative parts
Villages of Častonice and Písky are administrative parts of Křivoklát.

Geography
It is located in the Křivoklát Highlands, in the Křivoklátsko Landscape Protected Area. The municipality is situated in the meander of the Berounka River at its confluence with the Rakovnický Stream, which flows west of Křivoklát below the castle.

History
The castle was founded at the beginning of the 11th century. Between the 14th and 15th centuries, the first cottages appeared below the castle and the hamlet became known as Budy. Nearby hamlet Čamrdoves grew up, and during the 17th and 18th centuries they became one village. In 1886 the hamlets Budy, Amalín, Čamrdoves, and Častonice created a single administrative unit, the municipality of Křivoklát. In 1896, the municipality became a market town.

Until 1918, the village was part of the Austrian monarchy (Austria side after the compromise of 1867), in the Rakonitz – Rakovnik District, one of the 94 Bezirkshauptmannschaften in Bohemia.

Sights
Křivoklát is a popular tourist destination known for the medieval Křivoklát Castle.

Notable people
Irma Reichová (1859–1930), operatic soprano

References

External links

 
Křivoklát Castle 
Křivoklátsko Landscape Protected Area

Market towns in the Czech Republic